Richard Philipps, 1st Baron Milford (1744 – 28 November 1823), known as Sir Richard Philipps, Bt, from 1764 to 1776, was a Welsh landowner and Tory politician who sat in the House of Commons between  1765 and 1812.

Background and education
Philipps was the son of Sir John Philipps, 6th Baronet, of Picton Castle, and was educated at Pembroke College, Oxford. He succeeded in the baronetcy in 1764.

Political career
Philipps was returned to parliament for Pembrokeshire  in 1765 (succeeding his deceased father), and held the seat at the 1768 general election. However, in 1770 his election was declared void. In 1774 he was returned for Plympton Erle in Devon, a seat he held until 1779. In 1776 he was raised to the Peerage of Ireland as Baron Milford. As this was an Irish peerage he was able to remain in the House of Commons. He was out of parliament until 1784, when he was returned for Haverfordwest. In 1786 he was once again elected for Pembrokeshire, and continued to represent the constituency until 1812.

At the 1806 General Election, Philipps was opposed by the Owen family of Orielton but successfully held the seat. However, in 1812, he stood down in favour of John Frederick Campbell, heir to Lord Cawdor. At the ensuing election, however, Campbell was opposed and defeated by Sir John Owen of Orielton, who had recently inherited that estate from a distant cousin.

He was also Lord-Lieutenant of Haverfordwest from 1770 to 1823 and Lord Lieutenant of Pembrokeshire from 1786 to 1823.

Personal life
Lord Milford married Elizabeth, daughter of James Philipps, of Pentypark, in 1764. His only son with his first wife, Mary Grant,  John Philipps, was taken for dead after the Battle of Trafalgar. He died in November 1823. The barony died with him while he was succeeded in the baronetcy by a distant relative (see Viscount St Davids). He bequeathed his estates, including the family seat of Picton Castle, to his cousin Richard Grant, who assumed the surname of Philipps. Richard Grant was the son of John Grant and Mary Philippa Artemisia, daughter of James Child and Mary Philippa Artemisia, daughter of Bulkeley Philipps, uncle of Lord Milford. He was created a Baronet in 1828 and made Baron Milford in 1847.

References

Sources

External links

|-

1744 births
1823 deaths
Alumni of Pembroke College, Oxford
Barons in the Peerage of Ireland
Peers of Ireland created by George III
Members of the Parliament of Great Britain for Plympton Erle
Members of the Parliament of Great Britain for Welsh constituencies
British MPs 1761–1768
British MPs 1774–1780
British MPs 1784–1790
British MPs 1790–1796
British MPs 1796–1800
Lord-Lieutenants of Haverfordwest
Lord-Lieutenants of Pembrokeshire
Pembroke Yeomanry officers
Tory MPs (pre-1834)
Members of the Parliament of the United Kingdom for Welsh constituencies
UK MPs 1801–1802
UK MPs 1802–1806
UK MPs 1806–1807
UK MPs 1807–1812